Steve Stone is an Australian rugby league footballer who played professionally for the Canberra Raiders and the Adelaide Rams.

Playing career
Stone made his first grade debut for the Canberra Raiders in 1990, replacing Mal Meninga as a substitute. He played for the Raiders for seven seasons, mainly as a halfback but also starting games in the Second Row and at Lock.

In 1997 Stone signed with the new Adelaide Rams franchise in the Super League.

References

1969 births
Living people
Adelaide Rams players
Australian rugby league players
Canberra Raiders players
Place of birth missing (living people)
Rugby league halfbacks
Rugby league player agents